Joseph Whitehead may refer to:

 Joseph Whitehead (Canadian politician) (1814–1894), Canadian railway pioneer and politician
 Joseph Whitehead (Coca-Cola bottler) (1864–1906), lawyer, co-founder of the Coca-Cola Bottling Company
 Joseph Whitehead (Congressman) (1867–1938), lawyer, politician, member of the US House of Representatives from Virginia
 Joseph Whitehead (sculptor) (1868–1951), English sculptor and stonemason
 Joe Whitehead, actor in The Purple Monster Strikes